A railgun is a weapon that uses electromagnetic force to launch high velocity projectiles

Railgun or rail gun may also refer to:

 Railway gun, a large caliber artillery piece mounted on a railcar for rail mobility
 Benchrest rifle, also known as a rail gun, a type of rifle that is built into a machine rest
 A Certain Scientific Railgun, a manga and anime series
 Mikoto Misaka, also known as "Railgun", protagonist of the series and a character in the A Certain Magical Index series of light novels.